List of products manufactured by electronics company Minolta.

Cameras

16 mm film cameras
 Minolta 16 series

110 film cameras
 Minolta 110 Zoom SLR
 Minolta Autopak pocket camera
 Minolta Weathermatic A (bright yellow waterproof case)

126 film cameras
 Minolta Autopak 400X
 Minolta Autopak 500
 Minolta Autopak 550
 Minolta Autopak 600X
 Minolta Autopak 700
 Minolta Autopak 800

35 mm rangefinder and viewfinder cameras
 Minolta 35
 Minolta Hi-Matic series
 Minoltina (S and P)
 Minolta repo (Half frame 35mm)
 Minolta 24 Rapid (Square format 35mm)
 Leica CL (Also sold as the Leitz Minolta CL)
 Minolta CLE
 Minolta TC-1
 Minolta AF-C
Minolta Uniomat

35 mm SLRs

Manual focus (SR, SR-T and X series):
 Minolta SR-2 (1958-1960)
 Minolta SR-1 (variants 1959, 1960, 1961, 1962, 1963, 1965) (1959-1971)
 Minolta SR-3 (variants 1960, 1961) (1960-1962)
 Minolta SR-7 (variants 1962, 1963, 1965) (1962-1966) / Minolta SR 777 (prototype 1965)
 Minolta SR-1s (1967-?)
 Minolta SRM (1970-1975) (Integral motor 3.5 fps with battery handle)

 Minolta SR-T 101 (variants 1966, 1969, 1971) (1966-1975)
 Minolta SR-T 100 (variants 1970, 1971) (1970-1975)
 Minolta SR-T 102 / SR-T 303 / SR-T Super (1973-1975)
 Minolta SR-T SC (1973-1975) (exclusively sold by Sears)
 Minolta SR-T MC (1973-1975) (exclusively sold by J.C. Penney)
 Minolta SR-T 201 / SR-T 101b / SR 101 / SR 101s (1975-1977)
 Minolta SR-T 202 / SR-T 303b / SR 505 (1975-1977) 
 Minolta SR-T 200 (variants 1975, 1977, 1978, 1979) (1975-1981) / SR-T 100b (1975-1977), SR-T 100x (1977–81)
 Minolta SR-T 202 / SR-T 303b / SR 505s (1977)
 Minolta SR-T 101b / SR-T 201 / SR 101s (1977, 1978, 1979)
 Minolta SR-T SC-II (1977-1980) (exclusively sold by Sears)
 Minolta SR-T MC-II (1977-1980) (exclusively sold by JCPenney and K-Mart in the U.S., and K-Mart only in Europe)
 Minolta Ritz SR-T 201 (1978)

 Minolta XK / XM / X-1 (variants 1972, 1976) (1972-1981), Minolta Ritz XK (1978)
 Minolta XE / XE-1 / XE-7 (1974) 
 Minolta XE-5 / XEb (1975)
 Minolta XK Motor / XM Motor / X-1 Motor (1976) 
 Minolta XG 7 / XG 2 / XG-E (variants 1977, 1978)
 Minolta XD 5 (variants 1977, 1979)
 Minolta XD 7 / XD 11 / XD (variants 1977, 1978, 1979, 1980, 1981) (1977-1984), XD 11 Medical (variants 1980, 1981)
 Minolta XG-SE (1978)
 Minolta XG 1 (1978-1981)
 Minolta XG 9 / XG-S (1979)
 Minolta XD-s (variants 1980, 1981), XD-s Medical (variants 1980, 1981)
 Minolta X-7 (1980 - 1982)

 Minolta XG-A (1981)
 Minolta XG-M / X-70 (1981)
 Minolta X-700 (1981)
 Minolta XG-1(n) (variants 1981, 1982)
 Minolta X-570 / X-500 (1983)
 Minolta X-600 (1983)
 Minolta X-300 / X-370 (1984), Minolta X-7A (1985), Minolta X-370s (1995), Minolta  X-300x
 Minolta X-300s (1990), X-370n (1990), X-9 (1990)

Autofocus (α/Dynax/Maxxum series)

Autofocus (α/Dynax/Maxxum series):

Digital SLRs
 Konica Minolta Maxxum/Dynax 7D
 Konica Minolta Maxxum/Dynax 5D
 Minolta RD-175 (also sold as Agfa ActionCam) (1996) with Minolta A-mount
 Minolta Dimâge RD 3000 with Minolta V-mount

APS film and digital cameras - Vectis series
 Minolta vectis s 1(SLR-camera)
 Minolta vectis s 100 (SLR-camera)
 Minolta vectis 2000
 Minolta vectis weathermatic
 Minolta Dimâge RD 3000 with Minolta V-mount

Digital viewfinder cameras

 Minolta Dimâge EX Wide 1500 / Minolta Dimâge EX Zoom 1500 / Minolta MetaFlash 3D 1500
 Minolta DiMAGE 5
 Minolta DiMAGE 7 / Minolta DiMAGE 7UG
 Minolta DiMAGE 7i
 Minolta DiMAGE 7Hi
 Minolta DiMAGE A1
 Konica Minolta DiMAGE A2
 Konica Minolta DiMAGE A200
 (Konica) Minolta DiMAGE Z1
 Konica Minolta DiMAGE Z2
 Konica Minolta DiMAGE Z3
 Konica Minolta DiMAGE Z5
 Konica Minolta DiMAGE Z6
 Konica Minolta DiMAGE Z10
 Konica Minolta DiMAGE Z20

 Minolta DiMAGE X
 Minolta DiMAGE Xi
 Minolta DiMAGE Xt / Xt BIZ
 Konica Minolta DiMAGE Xg
 Konica Minolta DiMAGE X20
 Konica Minolta DiMAGE X21
 Konica Minolta DiMAGE X31
 Konica Minolta DiMAGE X50
 Konica Minolta DiMAGE X60
 Konica Minolta DiMAGE X1
 Minolta DiMAGE S304
 Minolta DiMAGE S404
 Minolta DiMAGE S414
 Minolta Dimâge RD 3000

 Minolta DiMAGE G400
 Minolta DiMAGE G500
 Konica Minolta DiMAGE G530
 Konica Minolta DiMAGE G600
 Minolta DiMAGE F100
 Minolta DiMAGE F200
 Minolta DiMAGE F300
 Minolta DiMAGE E201
 Minolta DiMAGE E203
 Minolta DiMAGE E223
 Minolta DiMAGE E323
 Konica Minolta DiMAGE E40
 Konica Minolta DiMAGE E50
 Konica Minolta DiMAGE E500
 Minolta Dimâge 2300
 Minolta Dimâge 2330
 Minolta Dimâge V
 Minolta Dimâge-Pic

Exposure meters
 Autometer IIIF, IVF, VF
 Flashmeter III, IV, V, VI
 Spotmeter M, F

Film scanners
 Minolta QuickScan 35 (2880) / Minolta QuickScan 35 Plus QS-2800 / QS-35
 Minolta Dimage Scan Dual F-2400 (2882)
 Minolta Dimage Scan Dual II AF-2820U (2886)
 Minolta Dimage Scan Dual III AF-2840 (2889)
 Konica Minolta Dimage Scan Dual IV AF-3200 (2891)
 Minolta Dimage Scan Speed F-2800 (2884)
 Minolta Dimage Scan Multi F-3000 (2883-102)
 Minolta Dimage Scan Multi II F-3100 (2883-121)
 Minolta Dimage Scan Multi Pro AF-5000 (2887)
 Minolta Dimage Scan Elite F-2900 (2885)
 Minolta Dimage Scan Elite II AF-2920 (2888)
 Minolta Dimage Scan Elite 5400 (2890)
 Konica Minolta Dimage Scan Elite 5400 II (2892)

Flatbed scanners
 Konica Minolta SC-110
 Konica Minolta SC-215

Binoculars
 ACTIVA D WP XL              8x42, 10x42 (Roof, BaK-4)
 ACTIVA D WP XL POCKET       8x25, 10x25 (Roof, BaK-4)
 ACTIVA D WP SPORT           8x42, 10x42 (Roof, BaK-4)
 ACTIVA WP                   8x25, 10x25, 12x25 (Porro, BaK-4)
 ACTIVA COMPACT FM           8-22x27, 10-30x27 (Porro, BaK-4)
 ACTIVA WP FP                7x35, 7x50, 8x40, 10x50, 12x50 (Porro, BaK-4)
 ACTIVA STANDARD ZOOM        7-15x35, 8-20x50 (Porro, BaK-4)
 ULTRA COMPACT UC III        6x16, 8x18 (Roof)
 COMPACT II SUPER            8x25, 10x25L (Porro, BaK-4)
 CLASSIC III WR              7x35, 7x50, 8x40 (Porro, BaK-4)
 CLASSIC WP SPORT for USA/Canada 8x42, 10x50, 12x50 (Porro, BK-7)
 CLASSIC WP SPORT for Europe 8x42, 7x50, 10x50, 12x50 (Porro, BaK-4)
 CLASSIC II                  7x35W, 7x50, 8x32, 8x40W, 10x50W
 CLASSIC II ZOOM             7-15x35, 8-20x50 (Porro, BK-7)   
 SPORT MINI WP               8x25, 10x25 (Roof, BK-7)
 STANDARD EZ   7x35 9.3", 7x50 7", 10x50 Wide Angle 6.5" (Porro, BK-7)
 STANDARD XL   10x50 Wide Angle 6.5" (Porro, BaK-4)
 STANDARD ZOOM EZ            7-15x35, 8-20x50 (Porro, BK-7)
 STANDARD ZOOM XL            7-15x35, 8-20x50 (Porro, BaK-4)
 STANDARD                    7x35EW, 7x50, 8x40EW, 10x50EW (Porro, BaK-4)
 STANDARD ZOOM               7-15x35, 7-21x50 (Porro, BaK-4)   
 WEATHERMATIC-YELLOW         7x42, 10x42 (Roof, BaK-4)
 WEATHERMATIC-BLACK          7x42, 10x42 (Roof, BaK-4)
 WEATHERMATIC COMPACT        8x23, 10x23 (Porro, BaK-4)
 POCKET                      7x21, 8x22WA, 9x24, 10x25WA (Roof, BK-7)
 POCKET II                   (Roof, BK-7)
 AUTOFOCUS                   8x22, 10x25 (Roof)
 AUTOFOCUS COMPACT           8x22, 10x25

Photo copiers 

 Di151
 Di152
 Di181
 Di183

 Di250/350
 Di251/351
 Di2510/3010/3510
 Di450/550
 Di470 * Di520/620

 Di551
 Di650
 Di750
 Di850

 Di1610
 Di1611
 Di2011
 Di5510
 Di7210

 CF1501
 CF2001
 CF2002
 CF3102
 CF5001
 CF9001

 bizhub 164
 bizhub 195
 bizhub 215
 bizhub 25e
 bizhub 227
 bizhub 287
 bizhub 308
 bizhub 368
 bizhub 308e
 Bizhub 181
 Bizhub 200
 Bizhub 223
 Bizhub 224e
 Bizhub 227
 Bizhub 25
 Bizhub 25e
 Bizhub 282
 Bizhub 283
 Bizhub 284e
 Bizhub 287
 Bizhub 308
 Bizhub 3301
 Bizhub 3320
 Bizhub 350
 Bizhub 36
 Bizhub 360
 Bizhub 361
 Bizhub 362
 Bizhub 363
 Bizhub 363
 Bizhub 364e
 Bizhub 368
 Bizhub 368e
 Bizhub 4020
 Bizhub 4050
 Bizhub 42
 Bizhub 420
 Bizhub 421
 Bizhub 423
 Bizhub 454e
 Bizhub 458
 Bizhub 458e
 Bizhub 4750
 Bizhub 500
 Bizhub 501
 Bizhub 552
 Bizhub 554e
 Bizhub 558
 Bizhub 558e
 Bizhub 600
 Bizhub 601
 Bizhub 652
 Bizhub 654
 Bizhub 654e
 Bizhub 658
 Bizhub 658e
 Bizhub 700
 Bizhub 751
 Bizhub 754
 Bizhub 754e
 Bizhub 808
 Bizhub 958
 Bizhub C203
 Bizhub C220
 Bizhub C224
 Bizhub C224e
 Bizhub C227
 Bizhub C25
 Bizhub C253
 Bizhub C258
 Bizhub C280
 Bizhub C284
 Bizhub C284e
 Bizhub C287
 Bizhub C308
 Bizhub C3350
 Bizhub C3351
 Bizhub C35
 Bizhub C350
 Bizhub C351
 Bizhub C353
 Bizhub C360
 Bizhub C364
 Bizhub C364e
 Bizhub C368
 Bizhub C3850
 Bizhub C3850FS
 Bizhub C3851
 Bizhub C3851FS
 Bizhub C450
 Bizhub C451
 Bizhub C452
 Bizhub C454
 Bizhub C454e
 Bizhub C458
 Bizhub C550
 Bizhub C552
 Bizhub C552DS
 Bizhub C554
 Bizhub C554e
 Bizhub C558
 Bizhub C558e
 Bizhub C650
 Bizhub C652
 Bizhub C652DS
 Bizhub C654
 Bizhub C654e
 Bizhub C658
 Bizhub C659
 Bizhub C754
 Bizhub C754e
 Bizhub C759
 Planetariums

 MS-6 (for six meter domes)
 MS-8 (for eight meter domes)
 Mediaglobe, Super Mediaglobe, Super Mediaglobe II
 Series II
 Series IIb

Printers
 bizhub 3300P
 bizhub 4000P
 bizhub 4700P
 bizhub C3100P
 magicolor 3730DN
 magicolor 4750EN 4750DN
 magicolor 7450 II
 magicolor 7450 II grafx
 magicolor 8650DN
 pagepro 4650EN
Minolta PT-2

Chlorophyll meters
 SPAD-501
 SPAD-502

Spectrometers for colour measurement

Word processors 
 PCW1

References

Minolta products
 
Technology-related lists